Niaz Murshed (also Morshed; born  May 13, 1966) is a Bangladeshi chess player. In 1987 he became the first South Asian to earn the Grandmaster title.

Early life
Murshed was born in Dhaka, Bangladesh, to Manzur Murshed and Najma Ahmed. He picked up the game from his older brother. His neighbor was Jamilur Rahman, who later became a national champion himself. These favorable conditions may have contributed to the young Murshed's devotion to chess. Murshed passed his SSC exam in 1983 from St. Joseph Higher Secondary School and HSC exam in 1985 from Dhaka College..

Career

Domestic chess
As a nine-year-old, Murshed entered the preliminary rounds of the national chess championship. Although he failed to qualify, he left a lasting impression on all present. By the age of 12, he was considered  one of the top players in Bangladesh. In 1978, he finished first in the national championship with two others, but ultimately placed third on a tie-breaker. He went on to win the next four national championships in 1979, 1980, 1981 and 1982. 

He became the national champion again after 30 years in 2012.

International chess
In 1979, Murshed played in his first international competition at Kolkata, India. In 1981, placed second in the zonal tournament, held in Sharjah, UAE the same year, earning his International Master Title in the process. Later that year, he tied for first in the Asian Junior Championship, held in Dhaka, but was counted second on tiebreak since he had fewer wins (and losses) than Ricardo de Guzman (Philippines) who was awarded the title and automatic IM.  Murshed participated in the 1982 World Junior Chess Championship, and although he failed to replicate his recent success, his game against Lars Schandorff of Denmark (later a grandmaster) was selected as the best game of the tournament. 

Murshed earned his first Grandmaster norm in 1984 due to his success in Bela Crkva Open, Yugoslavia (1983),  Oakham School Youth Tournament (ahead of Nigel Short and Maxim Dlugy), Commonwealth Chess Championship, Hong Kong 1984.  He earned his second grandmaster norm in 1986, thanks to his solid performance in Capstain International Tournament, Dhaka (1985) and Calcutta Grandmasters Tournament, Calcutta (1986). In 1987, FIDE awarded him the Grandmaster title, making him the first GM in South Asia. 

Upon earning his bachelor's degree in economics, Murshed returned to chess. However, his playing declined when he found it hard to adapt to the new generation of information driven chess. Nonetheless, he still found success from time to time in the international scene: first in the Goodrich, India (1991), second in the GM Tournament, Cebu, Philippines (1992), third in the Doha Chess Festival, Qatar (1993), T-1st place with two other contestants in the zonal tournament (1993), and finally, T-2nd place in the Commonwealth Chess Championship in 2004.

In November 2009 he tied for 3rd–8th with Anton Filippov, Elshan Moradiabadi, Merab Gagunashvili, Alexander Shabalov and Vadim Malakhatko in the Ravana Challenge Tournament in Colombo

Chess teams
He played for Bangladesh in the Chess Olympiads of 1984, 1990, 1994, 1996, 2002, 2004, 2012 and 2014.

Education
After earning his Grand Master title, Murshed went to the University of Pennsylvania to study economics. He played in only a handful chess tournaments during this time, but earned his bachelor's degree.

Style of play
Murshed plays primarily positional chess. He builds up small advantages, ultimately leading to a victory.

References

External links
 
 

1966 births
Living people
Bangladeshi chess players
Chess grandmasters
Asian Games competitors for Bangladesh
Chess players at the 2010 Asian Games
Chess Olympiad competitors
Recipients of the Independence Day Award
Dhaka College alumni